The Urysohn universal space is a certain metric space that contains all separable metric spaces in a particularly nice manner. This mathematics concept is due to Pavel Urysohn.

Definition
A metric space (U,d) is called Urysohn universal if it is separable and complete and has the following property: 
given any finite metric space X, any point x in X, and any isometric embedding f : X\{x} → U, there exists an isometric embedding F : X → U that extends f, i.e. such that F(y) = f(y) for all y in X\{x}.

Properties
If U is Urysohn universal and X is any separable metric space, then there exists an isometric embedding f:X → U. (Other spaces share this property: for instance, the space l∞ of all bounded real sequences with the supremum norm admits isometric embeddings of all separable metric spaces ("Fréchet embedding"), as does the space C[0,1] of all continuous functions [0,1]→R, again with the supremum norm, a result due to Stefan Banach.)

Furthermore, every isometry between finite subsets of U extends to an isometry of U onto itself. This kind of "homogeneity" actually characterizes Urysohn universal spaces: A separable complete metric space that contains an isometric image of every separable metric space is Urysohn universal if and only if it is homogeneous in this sense.

Existence and uniqueness
Urysohn proved that a Urysohn universal space exists, and that any two Urysohn universal spaces are isometric. This can be seen as follows. Take , two Urysohn universal spaces. These are separable, so fix in the respective spaces countable dense subsets . These must be properly infinite, so by a back-and-forth argument, one can step-wise construct partial isometries  whose domain (resp. range) contains  (resp. ). The union of these maps defines a partial isometry  whose domain resp. range are dense in the respective spaces. And such maps extend (uniquely) to isometries, since a Urysohn universal space is required to be complete.

References

Metric geometry